This was the first edition of the tournament.

Go Soeda won the title, defeating Blaž Kavčič in the final, 6–3, 2–6, 7–6(7–3).

Seeds

Draw

Finals

Top half

Bottom half

References
 Main Draw
 Qualifying Draw

ATP Challenger China International - Nanchang - Singles
2014 Singles